Maximiliano Ezequiel Cabaña (born 4 March 1999) is an Argentine footballer currently playing as a midfielder for OTP.

Career statistics

Club
.

Notes

References

1999 births
Living people
Argentine footballers
Argentine expatriate footballers
Association football midfielders
Ettan Fotboll players
Czech National Football League players
FK Viktoria Žižkov players
Argentine expatriate sportspeople in Sweden
Expatriate footballers in Sweden
Argentine expatriate sportspeople in the Czech Republic
Expatriate footballers in the Czech Republic
Kristianstad FC players
People from Ituzaingó, Corrientes
Sportspeople from Corrientes Province